The Rhenish Warmblood,  or , is a German warmblood breed of sport horse. It was registered with the Rheinisches Pferdestammbuch until 2014, when the Hannoveraner Verband took over management of the stud-book. It is traditionally bred around Warendorf State Stud, which it shares with the Westphalian, and is bred to the same standard as the Westphalian and other German warmbloods, such as the Bavarian Warmblood, Mecklenburger, Brandenburger, and Württemberger.

Characteristics
The breed standard calls for a horse of correct sport horse type that is long-lined, fitting into a rectangular outline rather than a square, and noble, a term that suggests aesthetic appeal that does not entail extreme refinement. In motion, the Rhinelander should portray boldness, a long stride, and an elastic quality at the walk, trot, and canter. The temperament, character and rideability of the Rhinelander make it suitable for any type of recreational or competitive riding. These horses are primarily bred for dressage and show jumping.

History
The Rhineland was once a heavy draft popular as a workhorse in Westphalia, Rhineland, and Saxony. The Rhine region was better known for breeding the heavy Rhenish German Coldblood which went on until the middle of the 20th century at Wickrath State Stud. About the time that Wickrath closed in 1957, breeding riding horses was gaining economic and cultural importance in Germany. The Rhenish Horse Studbook was founded in 1892 and registers many "specialty breeds", but is primarily concerned with the Rhinelander. In the 1970s, breeders began using lighter examples of the breed to refine the Rhinelander into an ideal sport horse specimen.  Stallions from the Hanover-Westphalia area were used on warmblood mares with Thoroughbred, Trakehner and Hanoverian bloodlines, out of dams with Rhenish origins. Early specimens lacked bone, but breeders have since worked to correct the shortcoming.

References

Horse breeds
Horse breeds originating in Germany
Warmbloods